The GS  is a front-engine, front-drive, four or five door, five passenger family car manufactured and marketed by Citroën in two series: for model years 1970-1979 in fastback saloon and estate bodystyles and subsequently as the GSA for model years 1980-1989 in hatchback and estate body styles — the latter after a facelift.  Combined production reached approximately 2.5 million.

Noted for its aerodynamic body shape with a drag coefficient of 0.318,
 fully independent hydro-pneumatic brakes and self-levelling suspension, and  air-cooled flat-four engine, the GS was styled by Robert Opron, with a low nose, a two-box silhouette, semi-enclosed rear wheels and a sharply vertical Kamm-tail. 

When the GS was named the European Car of the Year for 1971, the design was noted as technologically advanced, with class leading comfort, safety and aerodynamics.

Market placement
The GS filled the gap in Citroën's range, between the 2CV and Ami economy cars and the luxurious DS executive sedan. The DS had moved significantly upmarket from its predecessor the Citroën Traction Avant, and beyond the finances of most French motorists.  Leaving this market gap open for fifteen years allowed other manufacturers entry into the most profitable, high volume market segment in France. This combined with the development costs and new factory for the DS-replacing Citroën CX, the 1973/1974 oil crisis, and an aborted Wankel rotary engine, led Citroën to declare bankruptcy in 1974.

The GS met with instant market acceptance and was the largest selling Citroën model for many years. 1,896,742 GS models and 576,757 GSA models were produced in total.

Unlike the 2CV, Ami, DS and SM, the GS was never officially imported to the USA. A US export model was nearly finished when Citroën withdrew from the US market, with a few dozen cars brought over in 1971 for testing purposes and to be displayed in showrooms. After the project was cancelled, these orphaned cars were sold, mostly to employees of the dealerships. A sealed-beam headlight design was developed, and although never used as intended it was installed in Yugoslav- and Indonesian-assembled models as it made light replacement cheaper and easier.

Design stage

The GS took 14 years to develop from initial design to launch.

The 1955 DS19 was 65% more expensive than the car it replaced, the Citroën Traction Avant, leaving a large gap in the middle range of the market. 

In 1956, Citroën developed the C10, a bubble car prototype to fill the gap in its range between the large DS and the tiny 2CV. Development continued with ideas like a Wankel engine and hydropneumatic suspension suggested as possibilities, with a new, modern body to match. Another iteration was the "C60," which resembled an Ami 6 with a long, smooth nose.

In 1963, development had moved to "Project F", which was close to being production ready. Citroën decided the car was too similar to the 1965 Renault 16 and by 1967 Project F was suspended. Many of the mechanical components continued to "Project G", which became the GS. The GS was designed by Robert Opron, with a smooth two box design that bears some resemblance to the 1967 design study by Pininfarina Berlina Aerodinamica.

Launch and ongoing development

On 24 August 1970, Citroën launched the GS. The body style was as a Berline (a four-door saloon with three side windows), in a fastback style with a sharp Kammback. The aerodynamics gave the best drag coefficient of any vehicle at the time. On its launch, its main competitors in Europe included the Fiat 128, Ford Escort, Renault 6 and Vauxhall Viva.

The GS's aerodynamics enabled the car to make the best of the available power, but when introduced, the car was considered underpowered. In September 1972 Citroën addressed the issue with the introduction of an optional 1,222 cc engine. Both the second gear and final drive ratios were adjusted, increasing the vehicle speed per 1,000 rpm from 23 km/h (14.3 mph) to 24.5 km/h (15.2 mph). Larger front brake discs were also fitted.

From a design perspective, CEO Pierre Bercot considered a hatchback layout too utilitarian. The GS's initial fastback design, with a separate trunk/boot, was controversial, though the 1974 CX shared a similar configuration. The trunk/boot was nevertheless large, in part due to the positioning of the spare wheel within the engine compartment.

From September 1971 the GS was also available  as a four door station wagon (estate) and a similar two-door "service" van.

Both the early GS (until 1976) and the GSA were fitted with a rotating drum speedometer (similar in construction to bathroom scales), rather than the dials found in a conventional instrument panel. The later GS (from 1977 until the introduction of the GSA) had a conventional speedometer

The GS's radio was placed between the seats, and the parking brake was located on the dashboard. Adjacent to the radio was a suspension height adjustment lever. The steering wheel was single-spoke design, minimizing its potential intrusion on the driver in the event of an impact. On the later GSA, controls were organized in flanking satellites and a diagram of the car provided information on indicator lights or mechanical problems.

The GS was offered in four trims: G Special (base), GS Club (midrange), GS X (sports), and GS Pallas (luxury). The GS X and Pallas were only offered as saloons. 

The GS was facelifted in 1979 and given a hatchback, and renamed the GSA. This change reflected the growing sales of small family hatchbacks in Europe since the launch of the Volkswagen Golf. Revisions included the grille, plastic bumpers, taillights, hubcaps and exterior door handles. It also had a revised dashboard with the auxiliary controls on column-shaped pods so they could be reached without moving the hands from the single-spoked steering wheel; similar to the CX layout. 

The GS was followed by the larger BX in 1982, although production continued in reduced volumes until 1986. Citroën did not re-enter the small family hatchback market until the launch of the ZX in 1991.

Contemporary journalists noted the smooth ride quality – the hydropneumatic suspension is designed to absorb bumps and ripples that would be uncomfortable in a conventionally sprung car with just a slight body movement.

Mechanics
The vehicle had a front-wheel drive layout and was powered by a flat-4 air-cooled engine. A series of small engines were available, displacing 1,015, 1,129, 1,222 and 1,299 cc. Mated to a four speed gearbox, these were able to pull this car up to steady  at 6,250 rpm (with a 1,222 cc engine), due to the very aerodynamic body shape. Citroën's 3-speed C-Matic semi-automatic transmission was available as an alternative to the manual gearbox. The GS and GSA needed full use of the free-revving engines to maintain progress, except when cruising, in the tradition of the Citroën 2CV.

The four-wheel independent suspension featured a double wishbone layout at the front and trailing arms at the rear. Both axles comprised rigid sub frames that gave the car unmatched ride quality and road holding for the time, even on its narrow tires (factory-mounted Michelin ZX 145SR15).

Its central hydraulic system, powering the four disc brakes (inboard in front to help lower unsprung weight) and the advanced hydro-pneumatic self-levelling suspension, was derived from the Citroën DS. It also has a feature that increased or decreased braking pressure in accordance with cargo load, without any noticeable difference in the brake pedal response. The powered system was different from the typical assisted systems in that there was virtually no travel on the brake pedal even when braking hard. The hydraulic suspension allowed the car to be raised for rough terrain at low speeds (a feature taking account of the country lanes of its native France) and to full height for easy access to the partially enclosed rear wheels. The hand brake lever is mounted on the dashboard as opposed to being mounted between the front seats. In-car entertainment can be fitted in the space that would have been utilised by the handbrake. As with other Citroën cars, the hydraulic system depressurizes over several hours, so the car will sink to the bump stops when the engine is off.

The GS' 1.3-litre engine was also used in the French  "Odyssée" motorcycle. The engines were equipped with a single Solex carburetor and have a bespoke five-speed gearbox with shaft drive. About 650 of these were built between 1981 and 1988, most of them for French police authorities.

GS Birotor
A two rotor GS was launched in 1973. Dubbed the Citroën GS Birotor (also called Citroën GZ), it featured a much more powerful  Wankel birotor produced by the joint NSU-Citroën Comotor project. This style of motor is noted for its smooth power delivery which complemented the luxurious ride quality of the hydropneumatic suspension. Even better, the engine was small relative to its power, an advantage for Tax horsepower calculations, which drive automobile design in France.

The Birotor was extensively re engineered for the Comotor 624 engine. Discs all around (ventilated in front), different wheels with a five-bolt pattern rather than three, and a three-speed semi-automatic transmission were combined with a more luxurious interior and flared fenders to set the Birotor apart from its lesser siblings.

The Birotor cost as much as the larger Citroën DS, and 70% more than the standard GS. The fuel economy was worse than the largest DS - the DS23EFI. Since it was not economical for its size, and was launched in October 1973, the exact start of the 1973 oil crisis, the Birotor version achieved poor sales and was quickly pulled from the market, after 847 units were sold.

The sales were so disappointing that Citroën attempted to buy back and scrap each Birotor, as it did not want to support the model with spare parts. A few of these remarkable vehicles have nonetheless survived in the hands of collectors, many without titles for some time as Citroën did not want to recognize the cars.

GS production abroad

The GS and GSA were built in a number of countries besides France. 385,000 units were built in Vigo, Spain Besides Portugal, production or assembly took place in countries as varied as South Africa, Chile and Rhodesia (now Zimbabwe). The South African model was also available as the "GS-X2 Le Mans" special edition, only available in silver, red or black with an all-white interior with the uprated 1,222 cc engine producing 48 kW achieved by using high compression pistons, round, rather than oval inlet manifolds, a Weber carburetor, and larger diameter driveshafts. A variant of the X2 marketed in Europe, it featured special wheel trim, twin stripes along the sides incorporating an X2 emblem on the front fenders, a rear spoiler, a rear window louvre, and four round headlights mounted in black plastic housings. All three body-styles, GS and GSA versions and a mix thereof were built in Cakung in East Jakarta, Indonesia by PT Alun Indah. Indonesian production continued until at least 1990.

Renowned moped manufacturer Tomos in Yugoslavia (now Slovenia) also assembled the GS saloon at their plant in Koper. In 1973 a new company, Cimos, was formed by Citroën, Iskra, and Tomos and they took over production. Like the Indonesian models, Cimos sometimes used the twin-headlight fixtures developed for export markets on their GSs (although never on the well-equipped Pallas model). Slovenian GSs were commonly finished in "campus beige" color. The GSA was called the GA in Yugoslavia.

GSA in East Germany
Between 1979 and 1983, around 5,500 were exported to East Germany making it one of the few western cars in the country. Erich Honecker, the East German party leader, maintained a fleet of the larger CX model and several Volvos.

Documentary
Production of the GS is described in the Louis Malle documentary film, Humain, trop humain.

See also
 PSA Rennes Plant, concerning the plant in the south-west of Rennes where the GS was built.
 Citroën GS Camargue two-door concept car from Bertone

References

Further reading

External links

Citroen GS - Citroën Origins
Citroën GS and GSA website Much information and manypictures about GSs and GSAs around the world, detailed production figures, technical information, history of the car and Car club information.
la page de la GS
Citroën World – GS & GSA links
GS at Citroënët
GSA at Citroënët

GS
Mid-size cars
Front-wheel-drive vehicles
1980s cars
Cars introduced in 1970
Cars powered by boxer engines
Cars powered by Wankel engines
Station wagons
Cars discontinued in 1986